Ravensroost Wood is a 43.7 hectare biological Site of Special Scientific Interest in north Wiltshire, England.

The wood is the largest remnant of Braydon Forest and has benefited from many years of consistent management. It has a variety of trees, shrubs and ground flora.

The site was notified in 1989 and is managed – together with meadows to the north and south – as a nature reserve by Wiltshire Wildlife Trust.

References

Sites of Special Scientific Interest in Wiltshire
Sites of Special Scientific Interest notified in 1989
Wiltshire Wildlife Trust reserves